Basanta Singh (1890-1965) a.k.a. (Basanta Ram Garcha), was an Indian Wrestler, who wrestled in the United States.  Batsada was born in 1890 in Parowal in the Punjab.  While in the United States, Batsada worked with Gobar Goho also known as Chandra Guho, who helped to increase the fame of Batsada.  Basanta Singh competed in wrestling during the 1920s.  In 1929, Basanta Singh faced Matty Matsuda in the ring.  As a result of the injuries he sustained in the ring, Matsuda died.

Later life
Batsada never returned to India, and died in the United States in 1965.

References

Indian wrestlers
20th-century deaths
20th-century professional wrestlers
1890 births